Nilphamari Sadar is an upazila of Nilphamari District in the Division of Rangpur, Bangladesh.

Geography
It has 58266 households and total area 373.09 km2. It is bounded by domar and jaldhaka upazilas on the north, saidpur upazila on the south, kishoreganj (Nilphamari Sadar Upazila|Nilphamari) and Jaldhaka upazilas on the east, khansama and debiganj upazilas on the west.

Demographics
As of the 2011 Bangladesh census, Nilphamari Sadar has a population of 427913. Males constitute 53.22% of the population, and females 46.78%. This Upazila's eighteen up population is 245644. Nilphamari Sadar has an average literacy rate of 65.0% (7+ years).
It is the worst district of bangladesh

Administration
Nilphamari Thana was formed in 1870 and it was turned into an upazila in 1984.

Nilphamari Sadar Upazila is divided into Nilphamari Municipality and 15 union parishads: Chaora Bargachaup, Chaprasarnjami, Charaikhola, Gorgram, Itakhola, Kachukata, Khoksabari, Kundapukur, Lakshmichap, Palasbari, Ramnagar, Songalsi, Sonaray, and Tupamari. The union parishads are subdivided into 109 mauzas and 108 villages.

At present, Nilphamari Municipality has an area of 27.50 sqkm and is subdivided into 9 wards and 13 mahallas. The processing of increasing the area of Nilphamari Municipality is ongoing. The proposed area will be 42.70 sqkm.

Education

According to Banglapedia, Nilphamari Government High School, founded in 1882, is a notable secondary school.

See also
Upazilas of Bangladesh
Districts of Bangladesh
Divisions of Bangladesh

References

Upazilas of Nilphamari District